Rodolfo Rombaldoni (born 15 December 1976) is a basketball player from Sant'Elpidio a Mare, Italy, who won the silver medal with the Italian men's national team at the 2004 Summer Olympics in Athens, Greece.

References
 CONI profile

1976 births
Living people
Basketball players at the 2004 Summer Olympics
Fortitudo Pallacanestro Bologna players
Italian men's basketball players
Medalists at the 2004 Summer Olympics
Mens Sana Basket players
Olympic basketball players of Italy
Olympic medalists in basketball
Olympic silver medalists for Italy
Reyer Venezia players
Viola Reggio Calabria players
Scaligera Basket Verona players
Guards (basketball)
People from Sant'Elpidio a Mare